Matthew "Matt" Srama (born 12 January 1991) is an Australian former professional rugby league footballer who played for the Gold Coast Titans in the National Rugby League. Srama was educated at Forest Lake State High School.

Background
Born in Brisbane, Queensland, Srama is of Filipino and Polish descent and played his junior football for the Centenary Panthers before being signed by the Gold Coast Titans. In 2010 and 2011, Srama played for the Titans' NYC team.

Playing career

2011
On 12 May 2011, Srama re-signed with the Gold Coast on a three-year contract. In round 14 against the St George Illawarra Dragons, Srama scored his first NRL career try in the Titans 28-14 win at Jubilee Oval. Srama  finished his debut year in the NRL with him playing in 14 matches and scoring a try for the Titans in the season filling in for the injured regular hooker Nathan Friend. Although the season saw Srama establish himself in first grade, the club struggled on the field and finished last on the table, claiming the wooden spoon.

2012
Due to Titans regular hooker Nathan Friend departure to the New Zealand Warriors, Srama took the void of playing at the position playing in 23 matches and scoring 4 tries for the Gold Coast Titans in the 2012 NRL season.

2013
Srama finished the 2013 NRL season with him playing in 19 matches and scoring 2 tries for the Gold Coast Titans as the club finished ninth and narrowly missed out on the finals.

2014
In June 2014, Srama re-signed with the Gold Coast on a two-year contract. Srama returned to the Titans first grade squad in Round 9 against the South Sydney Rabbitohs playing off the interchange bench in the Titans 40-18 loss at Cbus Super Stadium. Srama finished off the 2014 NRL season with him playing in 6 matches due to a hip injury that cut his year short for the Gold Coast Titans. In November 2014, Srama was told he was free to leave the Titans by head coach Neil Henry, as he would be overlooked for other players in the NRL side. On 20 November 2014, Srama signed a 1-year contract with the Sydney Roosters, before backflipping on the deal shortly afterwards due to money issues.

2015
Srama finished off the 2015 season having played in three matches for the Gold Coast, his season hampered by ankle and shoulder injuries as well as being played in the Queensland Cup for the Tweed Heads Seagulls.

2016
In February, Srama played for the Titans in the 2016 NRL Auckland Nines. On 13 January 2017, Srama announced on Facebook that he would retire from the NRL due to injury. He played 65 NRL games in six seasons for the Titans, for 7 tries.

References

External links
2016 Gold Coast Titans profile

1991 births
Living people
Australian people of Filipino descent
Australian people of Polish descent
Australian rugby league players
Gold Coast Titans players
Philippines national rugby league team players
Rugby league hookers
Rugby league players from Brisbane
Tweed Heads Seagulls players
Australian real estate agents